The Knoxville Community School District is a rural public school district headquartered in Knoxville, Iowa.

The district is completely within Marion County, and serves the city of Knoxville, the town of Harvey, and the surrounding rural areas.

The school's athletic teams are the Panthers, and their colors are black and gold.

Schools
The district operates four schools, all in Knoxville:
 Northstar Elementary School
 West Elementary School
 Knoxville Middle School
 Knoxville High School

Knoxville High School

Athletics
The Panthers participate in the South Central Conference in the following sports.
Football
Cross Country
 Boys' 2-time Class A State Champions (1939, 1980)
Volleyball
Basketball
Bowling
Wrestling
Golf
 Girls' 1964 State Champions
Tennis
 Boys' 2001 Class 1A State Champions
Track and Field
 Boys' 1991 Class 3A State Champions
Baseball
 2002 Class 3A State Champions
Softball

See also
List of school districts in Iowa
List of high schools in Iowa

References

External links
 Knoxville Community School District

School districts in Iowa
Education in Marion County, Iowa